E4 is a British free-to-air public broadcast television channel owned and operated by Channel Four Television Corporation. The "E" stands for entertainment and the channel is primarily aimed at the 16/18–34 age group (similar to BBC Three, ITV2, 5Star, Sky Max, Sky Comedy, Comedy Central and Dave). 

Programmes currently shown on the channel include Hollyoaks, Made in Chelsea, Coach Trip (and its Halloween spin-off Celebrity Ghost Trip), Celebs Go Dating and various versions of Married At First Sight.  The most successful broadcast of the channel to date was on 11 October 2010 when an episode of The Inbetweeners received over 3.7 million viewers.

History

E4 launched as a pay television companion to Channel 4 on 18 January 2001. On 16 December 2004, Channel 4 announced that the subscription channel would become a free-to-air television channel by launching on the digital terrestrial television system. The switch took place on 27 May 2005 to coincide with the launch of Big Brother 6 later that evening.

E4 launched an Ireland service in June 2002, which has become the second most popular non-terrestrial channel in Ireland with 1.1% of the audience; Sky Max is the most popular. On 14 July 2003, E4 launched a timeshift service, E4 +1. E4 +1 is a 1-hour timeshift.

In August 2005, following the close of that year's Big Brother, E4 introduced the E4 Music programming block. The slot initially ran through much of the morning/daytime schedule, though was later reduced to mornings only, with the amount of scripted comedy and drama screened in daytime increased. Prior to the launch of E4 Music, E4 was off-air during daytime for much of the year, only going on air in daytime for rolling coverage of reality series such as Big Brother. In 2008, the launch of 4Music as a channel led to questions being asked about the future of E4 Music. However, E4 retained its commitment to music content, stating that E4 Music had been commissioned to run until at least the start of Big Brother in 2009. At 10am on Thursday 4 June 2009, the day before the launch of the 2009 Big Brother series, E4 Music ceased broadcasting.

In July 2007, it was announced Channel 4 would be launching E4 Radio, the first of a network of channels to be broadcast on DAB radio. The station was planned for launch in July 2008 and aimed at a similar demographic to its television channel, however this launch date was later delayed. In October 2008, Channel 4 announced it was abandoning its plans for digital radio, and thus scrapping the E4 Radio proposal.

On 14 December 2009, a high-definition simulcast of E4 launched on Sky+ HD channel 215, it was later added to Virgin Media on 1 April 2010. On 31 October 2013, E4 premiered a refreshed look as part of the channel's rebranding. This coincided with the debut of the seventh series of The Big Bang Theory, as well as the debut of original comedy Drifters.

On 27 September 2018, E4 was rebranded with a logo and identity, marking the first major rebrand since its launch in 2001. On 14 January 2019, it was announced that Channel 4 had partnered up with the American programming block Adult Swim, to air Adult Swim shows.

On 25 September 2021, transmission of channels operated by Channel 4 was impacted by the activation of a fire suppressant system at the premises of Red Bee Media. This resulted in music channel The Box being simulcast on Freeview in the place of 4Music (a channel known for repeating comedy and reality shows previously shown on E4) and E4+1 remaining off air for a number of days. E4+1 came back on air on 30 September 2021, in time for the series 6 finale of Married At First Sight to be broadcast. However the ongoing technical problems prevented this episode being shown, with a repeat of the previous episode being broadcast instead. The final episode was rescheduled for 1 October 2021 at 9pm on E4, taking over the Friday night film slot, with Married at First Sight: Afters scheduled for 10pm.

On 13 June 2022, it was announced that a new sister network – E4 Extra, would launch on 29 June in the slot accompanied by 4Music. E4 Extra is dedicated to comedy programming, with already existing comedy programmes such as The Big Bang Theory moving to the new channel, alongside the entertainment programming that airs on 4Music, which will move to the slot accompanied by Box Hits and transition back to a full-time music channel.

Availability

Cable
Virgin Media : Channel 106 (HD) and Channel 146 (+1)

Online
All 4 : Watch live
FilmOn : Watch live

Satellite
Freesat : Channel 122 and Channel 123 (+1)
Sky : Channel 135 (HD/SD), Channel 235 (+1) and Channel 830 (SD)
Sky : Channel 136, Channel 236 (+1) and Channel 345 (HD)

Terrestrial
Freeview : Channel 13 and Channel 30 (+1)

Programming

As of 2022, the channel has moved many of its acquired US shows such as Harley Quinn, Batwoman, The Goldbergs, Zoey's Extraordinary Playlist and Duncanville out of peak and put them in a daytime or a late night slot to continue their seasons. In their place, the channel has decided to strip a number of reality and dating series such as Married At First Sight UK, which has brought in audiences of around 2 million people each night to the channel. Married At First Sight UK is part of a franchise which also includes the imported Married at First Sight Australia and spin-off Married at First Sight UK: Afters with AJ Odudu.

In November 2021, Channel Four Television Corp. revived GamesMaster after 23 years, with Sir Trevor McDonald taking on the title role from the original "Games Master", Sir Patrick Moore. It also revealed that another one of its former primetime imports, The 100, will end its run by having the final season put out by E4 each night around 3:25am from Saturday 27 November 2021. This came about after the initial plan to play the final season on 4Music – as had been promoted in on-air trails in the weeks prior – was scrapped when the Red Bee incident disrupted transmission of programming on 4Music for over a month.

Even though E4 has decided to move a lot of its acquired US programmes to overnight slots, the channel is still broadcasting repeats of The Big Bang Theory alongside new episodes of Rick and Morty and Young Sheldon in primetime slots, while repeats of Mike and Molly and Brooklyn Nine-Nine fill up the daytime schedule.

After hosting repeats of the weekly Channel 4 satire panel show 8 Out of 10 Cats with Jimmy Carr, Sean Lock and Jon Richardson for many years, the production was adapted to become a title which debuted new episodes on E4 in 2017 (as the parent channel focused on its spin-off ...Cats Does Countdown). The version on E4 dispensed with the topical news questioning of later Channel 4 series and went back to being a show about random statistics and opinion polls, with Jimmy Carr continuing as host, alongside Rob Beckett and Aisling Bea as the team captains (replacing Lock and Richardson, who continued with the spin-off). As of 2022, titles such as The Inbetweeners still get repeated in a regular peaktime slot, alongside repeats of Channel 4's Taskmaster.

As of 2022 most comedy and drama had been moved (or, in the case of Brooklyn Nine-Nine, had come to an end) with weekday evening slots given over to reality programming – a mixture of original series (such as Teen Mum Academy and the 2022 revival of Embarrassing Bodies), first-run imports such as the Below Deck franchise, and repeated Channel 4 series such as Naked Attraction and Gogglebox. Sitcom reruns (and some first-run imports, such as The Neighborhood) by now chiefly aired on E4 in daytime and on 4Music in the evening.

Most watched programmes 
The following is a list of the ten most watched shows on E4, based on Live +7 data supplied by BARB up to 11 November 2018. The number of viewers does not include repeats or airings on E4+1.

Big Brother coverage
Between 2001 and 2010 when the reality series Big Brother (and Celebrity Big Brother) were being transmitted on Channel 4, E4 devoted much of its schedule to live coverage from inside the Big Brother house; interactive features that gave access to additional camera angles have also been transmitted. The channel also had Big Brother voting options, Big Brother spin-off shows such as Big Brother Live, Big Brother's Little Brother, Big Brother's Big Mouth, Diary Room Uncut and Big Brother highlights repeats. In June 2020, to mark the 20th anniversary of Big Brother'''s inception, E4 aired select episodes from both the civilian and celebrity programmes, in a series titled Big Brother: Best Shows Ever. Hosted by Davina McCall and Rylan Clark-Neal, the first episode of the series received one million viewers.

In 2022, as part of its season of Australian reality shows, E4 showed the 2021 series of Big Brother VIP on the channel under the name Celebrity Big Brother Australia. Launching on Sunday 6 February 2022 at 8pm and then scheduled every weekday at 7:30pm,Radio Times 12–18 February 2022, E4 listings for weekdays at 7:30pm, various pages the programme lasted for four episodes on the channel, before it was taken off mid-series and replaced by a number of 'best of' compilations taken from Junior Bake Off.

E4 Extra

In June 2022, Channel 4 announced that their music and entertainment channel 4Music's current channel slots would be replaced by a spinoff channel called E4 Extra on 29 June 2022, with 4Music taking Box Hits' slots on Freesat and Sky. With the change, E4 Extra will take entertainment shows like The Big Bang Theory, The Inbetweeners and Derry Girls and will add unscripted reality shows like Legendary, Ramsay's Kitchen Nightmares, Ninja Warrior Japan and Undercover Boss USA'', while 4Music will go back to being a music channel.

See also
 List of television stations in the United Kingdom

References

Further reading

External links
 
 E4 TV listings

Channel 4 television channels
Television channels in the United Kingdom
Television channels and stations established in 2001
2001 establishments in the United Kingdom